The Coleridge Power Station is a hydroelectric facility at Lake Coleridge on the Rakaia River in Canterbury, New Zealand.  The power station is owned and operated by TrustPower.

History
Coleridge was New Zealand's first major power station in which the state was involved. It was constructed mainly to supply electricity to Christchurch, with construction beginning in 1911 and completed with three generating units in 1914. For the most part it was built by hand, with some heavier work done by steam shovels.

In the early years of the station, demand for electricity in Christchurch grew rapidly and the transmission system extended to reach Rangiora in the north and Oamaru in the south. The limited capacity at Coleridge resulted in regular interruptions to supply. To remedy this the fourth generator was connected in April 1917, with two more connected in November 1921 and March 1922. The turbine hall was extended in 1924 to make room for additional larger turbines. By the early 1930s, Coleridge had reached capacity, and was supplemented in 1934 by the commissioning of the Waitaki Dam and in 1935 by extending transmission lines south to join Coleridge/Waitaki to Dunedin's Waipori scheme.

Water supply was a challenge, and so three river diversions were made to increase the amount of water available in the lake: the Harper River in 1922, the Acheron River in 1930, and later the Wilberforce River in 1977.

The station was built and initially owned by the New Zealand Government through the Hydro Electric Branch of the Public Works Department, which this branch later became the State Hydro Electric Department in 1946, which in turn became the New Zealand Electricity Department (NZED) in 1958, which then became the Electricity Division of the Ministry of Energy in 1978. In 1987, the government dissolved its responsibility for electricity to create a state-owned enterprise called the Electricity Corporation of New Zealand (Electricorp). Electricorp began downsizing staff and upgrading systems at the facility, and in 1994 it restructured into two subsidiaries. One subsidiary, Transpower, adopted responsibility for the outdoor switching yard, with the parent company planning to sell the facility at Coleridge. After Ngāi Tahu waived their right of first refusal to the facility, in 1998 the facility was purchased for $90.6 million by both Alpine Energy and Trustpower. Alpine Energy was only involved in the deal to circumvent a rule that the station could only be sold to a South Island company, with Alpine withdrawing from the scheme in 1998. The facility has been owned by Trustpower (now Manawa Energy) since.

Technical details

Coleridge is unusual in that it does not use a dam like most other hydroelectric facilities. Lake Coleridge is a natural lake that runs alongside a natural river, but at a much higher elevation. The newer No. 1 inlet is visible up at the lake as a whirlpool on calm days, with some of the older No. 2 inlet visible on the shore near to it. These tunnels terminate in large concrete surge chambers above the power station, which in turn connect to the distinctive steel penstock pipes that run down the hill above-ground to the turbine hall. Originally there were four of these pipes, however only two remain in use, with the other two disconnected half way up the hill. The water is discharged to the Rakaia River.

Currently only 5 turbines are operational, but despite having four fewer turbines than in 1930 they produce  more energy due to modern redesign and refurbishment using computational fluid dynamics modelling, completed in 2008.

Coleridge was the first station in the world to use aerated draft tubes on the turbines, invented on-site by Silston Cory-Wright to solve an issue with heavy thumping when under load. It was also the first to be built on glacial morraine, which caused significant issues with stability of the turbine hall.

The open-air switching yard supplies 66kV lines that run both east (connecting to the Transpower switch yard at Hororata and from there on to Christchurch) and west (across the Southern Alps via Arthur's Pass to supply the West Coast).

Turbines 
All turbines are of the horizontal Francis type.

See also

Electricity sector in New Zealand

References

Further reading

External links
TrustPower - Coleridge Power Station information
New Zealand Electricity information pamphlet 18787A-73 A – Lake Coleridge power station, 1973 pamphlet.

Energy infrastructure completed in 1914
Hydroelectric power stations in New Zealand
Buildings and structures in Canterbury, New Zealand